Horace Alexander William Bowell (27 April 1880 – 28 August 1957) was an English cricketer. Bowell was a right-handed batsman who bowled right-arm medium-fast.

Bowell made his first-class debut for Hampshire in the 1902 County Championship against Derbyshire.

He played 475 matches for Hampshire from 1902 until 1927, scoring over 18,000 runs.

References

1880 births
1957 deaths
Cricketers from Oxford
English cricketers
Hampshire cricketers
East of England cricketers